In number theory, a cyclotomic character is a character of a Galois group giving the Galois action on a group of roots of unity.

p-adic cyclotomic character
Fix  a prime, and let  denote the absolute Galois group of the rational numbers. 
The roots of unity  form a cyclic group of order , generated by any choice of a primitive th root of unity . 

One can thus write

This defines a group homomorphism called the mod  cyclotomic character:

which is viewed as a character since the action corresponds to a homomorphism .

Thus the  assemble to a group homomorphism called -adic cyclotomic character:

As a compatible system of -adic representations
By varying  over all prime numbers, a compatible system of ℓ-adic representations is obtained from the -adic cyclotomic characters (when considering compatible systems of representations, the standard terminology is to use the symbol  to denote a prime instead of ). That is to say,  is a "family" of -adic representations

satisfying certain compatibilities between different primes. In fact, the  form a strictly compatible system of ℓ-adic representations.

Geometric realizations 

In terms of motives, the -adic cyclotomic character is the -adic realization of the Tate motive .

Properties
The -adic cyclotomic character satisfies several nice properties.

It is unramified at all primes  (i.e. the inertia subgroup at  acts trivially).

See also
Tate twist

References

Algebraic number theory